God Knows It's True is an EP by Scottish rock band Teenage Fanclub, released in 1990 in the UK by Paperhouse Records and in 1991 in the USA by Matador Records. It was co-produced by Don Fleming, who had been introduced to the band earlier in 1990 by word of mouth, and who would also work on the band's next two albums, The King and Bandwagonesque.

Track listing

Personnel
Teenage Fanclub
Norman Blake 
Gerard Love 
Raymond McGinley
Brendan O'Hare 
Additional musicians
Don Fleming – extra backing vocals on "God Knows It's True"
Technical
Don Fleming – producer, mixing
Teenage Fanclub – producer
Wharton Tiers – engineer
David E. Zhivago – sleeve

Charts

References

1990 debut EPs
Teenage Fanclub EPs
Matador Records EPs
Albums produced by Don Fleming (musician)